A duty editor (also known as editor of the day) in news media, such as radio and television, is a senior journalist with editorial and managerial duties. A duty editor acts as an editor in the absence of the news editor (compare: duty officer). In many cases, it is the duty editor who takes most day-to-day decisions. The duty editor decides which content that shall be broadcast, how it shall be presented and in what order and gives assignments to reporters.

In large media organizations, the actual editor or news editor is often a senior manager who is seldom directly involved in day-to-day decisions, having delegated editorial duties to a senior journalist. The duty editor is usually the most senior journalist who is present at a news desk. There may be several duty editors on duty with different areas of responsibility; in the BBC, there is always a "home duty editor" and a "foreign duty editor" on duty, responsible for domestic and foreign news, respectively.

References

Types of editors